= Honnidibba =

- Village
- Location in Karnataka, India Honnidibba (India)
- Coordinates: 15°39′0.89″N 74°45′45.31″E
- Country: India
- State: Karnataka
- District: Belgaum

Languages
  - Official: Kannada
- Time zone: UTC+5:30 (IST)

Honnidibba is a village in Belgaum district in the southern state of Karnataka, India.
